Crystal Waters is the third studio album by singer-songwriter Crystal Waters, released on June 24, 1997, by Mercury Records/Polygram.  It includes her third pop crossover hit, "Say... If You Feel Alright", produced by Jimmy Jam and Terry Lewis. "Just a Freak" featuring Dennis Rodman was a club hit, and while not issued as a single, "Spin Me" (with background vocals by Karla Brown) which contains an interpolation of the Dead or Alive Hi-NRG classic, "You Spin Me Round (Like a Record)", is well known for having been featured on several Crystal Waters compilations. The album has sold over 100,000 copies worldwide.

Track listing
"Momma Told Me" (C. Waters, T. Douglas, J. Steinhour, G. Hudgins, A. Blast) – 6:16
"Love I Found" (C. Waters, T. Douglas, J. Steinhour, G. Hudgins, L. Dorsey) – 5:56
"On My Mind"  (C. Waters, T. Douglas, Maurice White, Al McKay, Alice Willis) – 5:10
"Uptown" (Prince) – 3:53
"Say... If You Feel Alright" (J. Harris III, T. Lewis, C. Waters, M. White, A. McKay, A. Willis) – 3:56
"Easy" (C. Waters, T. Douglas, J. Steinhour, I. Madden) – 5:36
"Female Intuition" (C. Waters, R. Nowels, B. Steinberg, G. Black) – 4:52
"Let Go My Love" (C. Waters, T. Douglas, J. Steinhour, G. Hudgins) – 5:24
"Just a Freak" (featuring Dennis Rodman, (C. Waters, R. Payton, D. Smith) – 4:12
"Body Music" (C. Waters, D. Austin) – 4:43
"Spin Me" (C. Waters, P. Burns, S. McCoy, M. Percy, T. Lever) – 4:53
"Passion" (C. Waters, T. Douglas, J. Steinhour) – 5:44
"Who Taught You How" (C. Waters, E. Kupper) - 4:58 (International Bonus Track)
"Something To Remember" - 4:02 (Japan Only Bonus Track)

References

External links
 
 Crystal Waters Liner notes on Discogs.com

1997 albums
Crystal Waters albums
Mercury Records albums
Albums produced by Jimmy Jam and Terry Lewis
Soul albums by American artists